Trigun Stampede (stylized in all caps) is a Japanese anime television series, based on the manga series Trigun by Yasuhiro Nightow. It is animated by studio Orange and directed by Kenji Mutō. The series premiered on TV Tokyo in January 2023.

Plot
In the far future, Earth has become uninhabitable, forcing humanity to evacuate in massive colony fleets to search for habitable planets. In order to sustain the fleets and the colonies they will eventually build, humanity also created plants, artificial organic lifeforms that can produce infinite, clean energy. In one colony fleet, two brothers named Vash and Nai are born with a special connection to plants and are cared for by Rem. However, the colony fleet's computer systems suddenly malfunction, causing the entire fleet to crash land on the arid planet of Noman's Land. Rem sacrifices herself to save Vash and Nai, but Vash is mortified to learn that Nai was responsible for the disaster, as he seeks to kill all humans for exploiting plants. 

Many years later, the survivors of the colony fleet have built several cities on Noman's Land's surface, being totally dependent on plants to survive the hostile conditions. A now adult Vash wanders the desert aimlessly, having been branded a dangerous outlaw nicknamed "Vash the Stampede" or the "Humanoid Typhoon", while Nai continues his schemes and has taken up the nickname "Millions Knives". As Vash tries to find a way to peacefully resolve the differences between humans and plants, he runs into the investigative reporters Meryl Stryfe and Roberto De Niro, marking the starting point of a new adventure for the three of them.

Voice cast

Production
Toho producer, Katsuhiro Takei, commented that for the project they wanted to "start a new Trigun", commenting that "there's already the original manga, of course, and there's other anime adaptations, and each of them are really excellent pieces of work that are already completed." Takei stated that with Trigun Stampede they wanted to attract new viewers and not make them think that it is hard to get into the series "because it's an already known and existing series." When Takei approached the original manga author, Yasuhiro Nightow, to discuss the project, Nightow mentioned that the first anime adaptation was "really excellent", and that "anything beyond the original anime is more of a bonus time, so you could pretty much do whatever you want to with it." Nightow stated that he was "involved from the very start", and that in order to make "something entirely new", he would come in and say something to the staff if they did "something that really seems off"; however, as the script was developed, Nightow did not find major issues with it, commenting that "it was a new Trigun, and I felt that they were able to grasp that."

Regarding the use of 3DCG animation, Takei commented that the core of Trigun is "something that is very firm" that does not get affected by introducing additional elements, expressing: " I felt this really strong core could be adapted into various things, so I thought, well, in this Trigun let's do 3DCG." Orange animation producer, Kiyotaka Waki, commented that the project started with concept art, followed by the development of a world for the adaptation, which "wasn't just drawings, it was filled with ideas of how we could respect that old nostalgia factor and also add in the new designs." The project's development took around five years, starting in 2017, as pointed out by Waki, before the broadcast debut of Orange's first non-co-produced series, Land of the Lustrous. The CG modeling took a year and a half before the first trailer release in July 2022. 

Takei stated that while in the original manga and the previous anime adaptations the story is always centered around Vash, in Trigun Stampede they "really want to focus on the depth of Vash", so they decided to focus on his origin, memories, and the time he spent with Rem and Knives.

The soundtrack was composed by Tatsuya Kato. Regarding the music, Takei expressed that while developing the series, he considered the choice to use new music, different from Tsuneo Imahori's 1998 series soundtrack. As they were developing the script and concept art, Takei felt that Imahori's soundtrack would not "suit the world we're building."

Release

Animated by Orange, the series was announced in June 2022. It is directed by Kenji Mutō, with Tatsurō Inamoto, Shin Okashima, and Yoshihisa Ueda writing the screenplay, Kōji Tajima serving as concept designer and credited with the character concept, and Nao Ootsu serving as chief designer. Kōdai Watanabe, Tetsurō Moronuki, Takahiko Abiru, Akiko Satō, Soji Ninomiya, and Yumihiko Amano are designing the characters, and Tatsuya Kato is composing the music. The series premiered on January 7, 2023, on TV Tokyo and other networks.

Crunchyroll has licensed the series for a global release, excluding Asia, but including the Philippines, Singapore, India, Pakistan, Bhutan, Sri Lanka, Bangladesh, Nepal, Kazakhstan, and Kyrgyzstan. Medialink also licensed the series in Southeast Asia and streamed on Ani-One Asia YouTube channel, Amazon Prime Video and Bilibili. The English dub premiered on January 21, 2023, and features Johnny Yong Bosch reprising his role as Vash.

References

External links
  
 

2023 anime television series debuts
Crunchyroll anime
Japanese computer-animated television series
Medialink
Orange (animation studio)
Space Western anime and manga
Toho Animation
Trigun
TV Tokyo original programming